is a Japanese neuroscientist. She was appointed as the Vice-president of Tohoku University in 2018, a Professor of Developmental Neuroscience, and the Director of the Core Center for Neuroscience at that university. Osumi also presided at the Molecular Biology Society of Japan, 2013-2014.

Biography

Background 
Noriko Osumi is from Kanagawa Prefecture. She graduated from the School of Dentistry at Tokyo Medical and Dental University in 1985, and from the Graduate School at that institution in 1989.

Family 
Her parents were biologists, consisting of Seiji Osumi, a cetologist, and Masako Osumi, an electron microscopist. The environment has aroused her interest in living things and led her to read all the pictorial books at home. She loved books and read biographies on a regular basis in elementary school.

Junior high and high school years 
Osumi admired an architect and an editor in junior high school. However, she selected a faculty of dentistry after respecting the profession to cure patients. She described that she did not select a medical school because she could not determine to be a physician who bears the responsibility of human lives.

Undergraduate years 
After enrolling in the university, She spent balanced college days by attending to tennis club faithfully and obtaining grades to pass all examinations. She initiated tennis in university as a beginner which developed strategic thinking skills. In addition, she claims that tennis profoundly influenced her future plan.

Graduate years 
Osumi planned to be admitted to the graduate school as no resident internship was provided. Female researchers were, however, a minority at that time. In the end, she enrolled in the graduate school after being assisted by Prof. Kazuhiro Eto, her senior of the tennis club, who established a new laboratory with open environment.

In the laboratory, she researched the development of the face and neural crest cells. This field was only studied in that laboratory in Japan and even less than ten in the world. The research was realized in Tokyo Medical and Dental University, which is a comparatively small college, not one of the former imperial universities. This selection of a resistance dealing defined further directions of her research.

Career 
After her graduate studies, Osumi initiated her career as a research associate in faculty of dentistry at her alma mater of Tokyo Medical and Dental University.

After engaging in a research associate for several years, Dr. Akira Kakizuka indicated that she had contributed our study as an assistant for a long period. Hence, Osumi resolved to be an independent researcher, moving to the National Center of Neurology and Psychiatry as a section chief of the National Institute of Neuroscience in 1996. In this period, it was revealed that PAX6 gene acted to develop the brain in addition to the face, especially the eyes, that led her to research on the development of the brain. In 1998, she moved to Tohoku University as a first female professor at the graduate school of medicine. Furthermore, she was assigned to be a special advisor for gender equality in 2006, and served as a distinguished professor from 2008 to 2010 at Tohoku University. In 2018, she was appointed a vice president for public relations and promotion of diversity and a chief librarian of Tohoku University Library.

Current research topics 
Osumi specializes in neuroscience (neuroembryology, developmental neuroscience) to reveal the scheme of human mind in terms of brain development. She retains a keen interest in psychiatric disorder, especially issues related to depression and autism. This motive is derived from suicide of her friend, Dr. Kazuhiko Umesono, which enhanced her desire to discover effective strategies to support, save or strengthen human mind.

Notes 
Noriko Osumi is not a relative of Yoshinori Ohsumi, the Nobel prize winner, but because of the similar family name, she is often misunderstood as his child or his wife.

Publications 
Life Science columns on Diamond Weekly
Osumi has contributed life science articles for Japanese general readers on a popular weekly news magazine, starting in February 2015 and running for three years. The series was called "the Cutting-edge science for adults".

Journal articles

References

External links 
Noriko Osumi Lab, Tohoku University Graduate School of Medicine

Living people
Japanese neuroscientists
Japanese women neuroscientists
Tokyo Medical and Dental University alumni
Academic staff of Tohoku University
Year of birth missing (living people)